The Roman Catholic Diocese of Shimoga is a diocese located in the city of Shimoga in the Ecclesiastical province of Bangalore in India.

History
 14 November 1988: Established as Diocese of Shimoga from the Metropolitan Archdiocese of Bangalore and Diocese of Chikmagalur
On 16 July 2012, Gerald Isaac Lobo was appointed as the first bishop of the newly erected Diocese of Udupi and installed on 15 October 2012.

http://www.shimogadiocese.org/index.html

Sacred Heart Church
The second largest church in India, the sacred Heart Church is a fine example of an architectural marvel of Shimoga. It is a Catholic church spread over an area of 18000 sq ft.

The structure of the church is quite incredible built in a Roman and Gothic styles and houses a big prayer hall with a huge space for 5000 people. However, a statue of Jesus is the salient feature of the church attracting people in large numbers.

Leadership
 Bishops of Shimoga (Latin rite)
 Bishop Francis Serrao, SJ (ordained - 7 May 2014)
 Bishop Gerald Isaac Lobo (20 March 2000 – 16 July 2012) (nominated bishop of Udupi)
 Bishop Ignatius Paul Pinto (later Archbishop) (14 November 1988 – 10 September 1998)

Saints and causes for canonisation
 Ven. Mary Jane Wilson was born in Harihar

References

External links
 GCatholic.org 
 Catholic Hierarchy 

Roman Catholic dioceses in India
Christian organizations established in 1988
Roman Catholic dioceses and prelatures established in the 20th century
Christianity in Karnataka
1988 establishments in Karnataka